Seeking a Friend for the End of the World is a 2012 American apocalyptic romantic comedy-drama film, written and directed by Lorene Scafaria, in her feature directorial debut. The film stars Steve Carell and Keira Knightley as a pair of strangers who meet and form an unexpected bond as they help each other find closure in their lives before an asteroid wipes out life on Earth. The inspiration for the title comes from a line in Chris Cornell's song "Preaching the End of the World", from his 1999 debut solo album Euphoria Morning.

The film was theatrically released on June 22, 2012, in the United States by Focus Features. It received mixed reviews from critics and was a box-office bomb, earning $9.6 million on a $10 million budget. It was released on DVD and Blu-ray Disc and made available for digital streaming in the United States on October 23, 2012.

Plot
In NYC, a breaking news report informs the world that a mission to stop an incoming 70-mile wide asteroid known as "Matilda" has failed and that it will make impact in three weeks, destroying all life on Earth. Dodge Petersen and his wife, Linda, listen to the broadcast parked on the side of the road. When he expresses disinterest, she looks disgusted and abandons both the vehicle and their marriage. 

At home, Dodge reminisces about his high school sweetheart, Olivia, when he notices his neighbor Penny crying on the fire escape. She just broke up with her boyfriend Owen for making her miss her last opportunity to see her family in England. 

Dodge stops going to his job at an insurance company when one of his co-workers commits suicide. He also attends a bacchanal at the house of his best friend, where he politely avoids the amorous intentions of a friendly stranger and of his best friend's wife (on the latter case, he says he cannot cheat with a married woman, but she points out that marriage means nothing now that civilization is going to end). 

At her apartment, Penny gives Dodge three years worth of his mail that was incorrectly delivered to her and, in the process, unwittingly tells him that his wife was having an affair. Dodge storms off into the night, guzzling codeine-laced cough syrup and window cleaner in a suicide attempt. 

Dodge wakes up in a park, with a dog tethered to his foot and a note on his sweater reading "Sorry", which becomes the dog's name. Dodge takes Sorry home, opens the old mail, and is surprised to discover a three-month-old letter from Olivia, which explains that he was "the love of her life". 

Later, a riot breaks out in their neighborhood. Dodge and Penny abandon the self-centered Owen amid the rioters, with Dodge explaining to Penny that he knows someone who could fly her to England if she helps him find Olivia. She agrees, and they set off with Sorry for Dodge's hometown in Delaware.

Along the way, Dodge and Penny run out of gas, witness the bizarre death of suicidal motorist Glenn whose plan to pay an assassin to kill him without warning pays off, see the beginning of an orgy at a chain restaurant but leave hurriedly before the frenzied sex begins, have sex themselves in a pick-up truck, and spend a night in jail. 

They get a ride to Camden, New Jersey, where they meet Penny's ex-boyfriend, Speck, who is prepared for the apocalypse with a well-stocked underground bunker. Speck has a working satellite phone and lets Penny contact her family. 

Penny and Dodge borrow a car from Speck and eventually make it to Olivia's family home. They walk up to the door of the home but find no one home and then spend the day together; they realize a mutual affection. Penny discovers a letter from Olivia to her parents, which reveals her address. Penny and Dodge drive to Olivia's home, where Dodge leaves her a letter to Olivia, expressing his feelings for Penny. 

Later, they go to the house of the man who Dodge promised could take Penny to England. The man turns out to be his estranged father, Frank. After making amends with Frank, Dodge puts a sleeping Penny into his father's plane, whispering to her that she is the real love of his life. Frank and Penny depart, leaving Dodge behind. 

Dodge takes refuge in Penny's apartment and awaits his imminent death until she unexpectedly returns, upset that he allowed her to leave. They lie in bed and comfort each other as they feel the tremor of the asteroid's impact. Penny expresses regret at not having met Dodge sooner, while he assures her that their meeting had been opportune. Penny smiles as everything fades to white.

Cast

 Steve Carell as Dodge Petersen
 Keira Knightley as Penelope "Penny" Lockhart
 William Petersen as Glenn
 Melanie Lynskey as Karen Amalfi
 Adam Brody as Owen
 Tonita Castro as Elsa
 Mark Moses as Anchorman
 Derek Luke as Alan Speck
 Connie Britton as Diane
 Patton Oswalt as Roache
 Rob Corddry as Warren
 Rob Huebel as Jeremy
 Gillian Jacobs as Katie
 T.J. Miller as Darcy
 Amy Schumer as Lacey
 Jim O'Heir as Sheriff
 Martin Sheen as Frank Petersen
 Nancy Carell as Linda Petersen
 Roger Aaron Brown as Alfred
 Aleister as Sorry

Production
Lorene Scafaria wanted to "tell the story of boy meets girl with a really ticking clock", prompted by recent events in her own life, including a "death in the family, a breakup, and a new relationship". Scafaria also took inspiration from her experience during the September 11 attacks. Having recently moved from New York to Los Angeles, the attacks left her feeling "stranded" and so she ended up getting in contact with old friends. Later, she commented that she "found it interesting that this cataclysmic event would have such an effect on my own human behavior and relationships." In terms of movies, Scafaria found inspiration in films such as 2012 (2009) and The Day After Tomorrow (2004). The story, specifically that of an "unexpected romance blossoming between two strangers while on an impromptu road trip", shares similarities to that of her previous screenplay, Nick & Norah's Infinite Playlist (2008), and it was while titling the previous movie that she thought, "What if you took forever off the table?" Scafaria said that Adam Brody helped her with the script, giving her a male perspective to the soundtrack.

It was the first movie Carell filmed after ending his seven-year run on The Office. His character's wife was played by his actual wife. The scene where she dumps him was filmed on their 17th wedding anniversary; Scafaria got them a cake and the crew sang Happy Anniversary.

Reception
The film received mixed reviews from critics, with many praising the cast, particularly Knightley and Carell.  The Rotten Tomatoes consensus summary called it "tender, charming, and well-acted, Seeking a Friend for the End of the World is unfortunately hamstrung by jarring tonal shifts and a disappointing final act," with 55% of critics giving it a positive rating, based on 174 reviews, and an average rating of 6.1/10. On Metacritic the film has a score of 59 out of 100, based on reviews from 36 critics. Audiences surveyed by CinemaScore gave the film a grade C+ on scale of A to F.

Roger Ebert of the Chicago Sun Times gave the film a positive review and said, "The best parts of this sweet film involve the middle stretches, when time, however limited, reaches ahead, and the characters do what they can to prevail in the face of calamity. How can I complain that they don't entirely succeed? Isn't the dilemma of the plot the essential dilemma of life?" Joe Neumaier, of the New York Daily News, said that the film was "One of the year's most emotionally affecting movies." Film critic Nathan Heller wrote in Vogue magazine that the script was "desperately in need of a good edit" and commended the performances of Knightley and Carell: "Carell and, more surprisingly, Knightley are comedians proficient enough to sell the banter."
Peter Debruge of Variety magazine wrote: "The end of the world can't come fast enough in Seeking a Friend for the End of the World, a disastrously dull take on the disaster-movie formula."

The film performed poorly on its opening weekend, earning only $3 million, but managed to debut at Number 4 on the UK Box Office for the week ending July 15, 2012. The film earned a worldwide total of $9.6 million against a production budget of $10 million.

Home media
Seeking a Friend for the End of the World was released on DVD and Blu-ray Disc and made available for digital streaming in the United States on October 23, 2012.

Music

Soundtrack
The soundtrack was released June 19, 2012.
 Wouldn't It Be Nice - Performed by The Beach Boys
 Devil Inside - Performed by INXS
 Sex Tourists - Performed by French Kicks
 In The Time Of My Ruin - Performed by Frank Black
 Set Adrift On Memory Bliss - Performed by PM Dawn
 The Sun Ain't Gonna Shine (Anymore) - Performed by The Walker Brothers
 The Air That I Breathe - Performed by The Hollies
 Dance Hall Days - Performed by Wang Chung
 Ooh - Performed by Scissor Sisters
 This Guy's In Love With You - Performed by Herb Alpert & The Tijuana Brass
 Stay With Me - Performed by The Walker Brothers
 Dodge Walks Home/The Beach - Jonathan Sadoff / Rob Simonsen

Other music
 Home to Sacramento - Performed by The Steam Machine
 Cinco de Hiphop - Performed by Francisco Santacruz
 New Day - Performed by Hallo Moon
 Pastel Lights - Performed by Ishi
 Everybody Have Fun Tonight - Performed by Wang Chung
 On My Radio - Performed by The Selecter
 My Time To Shine - Performed by Guilty Simpson
 Let's Go Out Tonight - Performed by Lions
 Cavaleade - Written and Performed by Roger Renaud
 Tijuana Ride - Written and Performed by Paul Williams
 The Cherry Tree - Written and Performed by Steve Sidwell
 Bopology - Written and Performed by Ray Davies

References

External links
 
 

2010s road comedy-drama films
2012 romantic comedy-drama films
2010s science fiction comedy-drama films
2012 directorial debut films
2012 films
American road comedy-drama films
American romantic comedy-drama films
American science fiction comedy-drama films
Anonymous Content films
Female bisexuality in film
Films directed by Lorene Scafaria
Films produced by Steve Golin
Films scored by Rob Simonsen
Films set in 2021
Films set in Delaware
Films set in the future
Films set in New Jersey
Films set in New York City
Films shot in Los Angeles
Focus Features films
Films about impact events
Indian Paintbrush (production company) films
Male bisexuality in film
Mandate Pictures films
2010s English-language films
2010s American films